Prestonia may refer to:
 Prestonia, Louisville, a neighborhood southeast of Louisville, Kentucky, US
 Prestonia, Missouri, an unincorporated community
 Prestonia (plant), a  genus of flowering plants in the family Apocynaceae
 Prestonia (butterfly), a genus of butterflies in the family Pieridae
 Prestonia, the code name for Intel Xeon CPU

Genus disambiguation pages